Tony Tay is a businessman and founder of volunteer group (Willing Hearts) that provides meals to poor people in Singapore. He is the recipient of Ramon Magsaysay Award in 2017.

References

Living people
Singaporean philanthropists
1947 births